Arlette Chabot (born 21 July 1951) is a prominent French journalist and political commentator. She was until August 2010 the head of the editorial team of France 2. In March 2011 she moved to the radio station Europe 1 to become head of news and information.

Chabot began her career at France Inter in 1974, where she was a speaker and headed the political services of the redaction. In 1984, she joined TF1 and headed its political service until 1990. She joined FR3 and became head redactor of the political and economical service. From 1992, she held the same office at France 2. From 1994 to 1998, she was deputy director of the redaction of France 2.

She animated the debate show Mots Croisés from September 1997 to September 2005, when she was replaced by Yves Calvi.

From February 2004 until February 2011, Arlette Chabot was director of the  editorial team of France 2, replacing Olivier Mazerolle. She has also hosted the show À vous de juger on France 2 since September 2005.

Chabot was one of the journalists (along with Patrick Poivre d'Arvor) who moderated the 2 May 2007 French presidential debate between Ségolène Royal and Nicolas Sarkozy.

Honours 
 Officer of the Légion d'honneur (July 2017).

External links 
 

1951 births
Living people
French television journalists
French television executives
Women television executives
People from Chartres
Officiers of the Légion d'honneur